Johann Baal also Pater Marianus Baal (18 December 1657 in Karlstadt – 1701) was a German composer. Baal was attached to the court of the Prince-Bishopric of Bamberg. Among Baal's surviving works is a Mass in A, the five sections of which survive in the handwriting of a copy by Johann Sebastian Bach and his cousin Johann Gottfried Walther.

Recordings
 Mass in A. Instrumental works. Musica Canterey Bamberg, dir. Gerhard Weinzierl 1997

References

1657 births
1701 deaths
German Baroque composers
German male classical composers
German classical composers